Elke Holtz (born 27 April 1964) is a Mexican breaststroke and medley swimmer. She competed in three events at the 1980 Summer Olympics.

References

External links
 

1964 births
Living people
Mexican female medley swimmers
Olympic swimmers of Mexico
Swimmers at the 1980 Summer Olympics
Pan American Games bronze medalists for Mexico
Swimmers at the 1979 Pan American Games
Place of birth missing (living people)
Central American and Caribbean Games silver medalists for Mexico
Central American and Caribbean Games medalists in swimming
Competitors at the 1978 Central American and Caribbean Games
Mexican female breaststroke swimmers
Medalists at the 1979 Pan American Games
Pan American Games medalists in swimming
21st-century Mexican women
20th-century Mexican women